Eddie Korbich (born November 6, 1960) is an American actor, singer and dancer. He was born in Washington, D.C. but grew up in Shamokin, Pennsylvania.

Career

1980s
He graduated from the Boston Conservatory with a B.F.A. in acting in 1983. In 1985, he appeared in A Little Night Music at the Equity Library Theatre in New York, New York. In 1987 he was in both the Off-Broadway production of Flora the Red Menace (Vineyard Theatre) and Off-Off-Broadway The No-Frills Revue (Musical Theatre Works)

His first listed show on Broadway was in  Singin' in the Rain at the Gershwin Theatre, then in the Sweeney Todd revival in 1989 at the Circle in the Square Theatre. He starred as Tobias Ragg, with Bob Gunton as Sweeney and Beth Fowler as Mrs. Lovett. He starred in Godspell at Lamb's Theatre in 1988.

1990s
In the role he is probably most well known for, he starred as assassin Giuseppe Zangara in the 1990 Off-Broadway production of Assassins at the Playwrights Horizons. He also was in the original production of Casino Paradise at the Plays and Players Theatre and the Alley Theatre premiere of Jekyll & Hyde playing Bisset the apothecary.

The Fields of Ambrosia was his next endeavor in the original production at the George Street Playhouse in 1993.

He then starred in the original Off-Broadway Eating Raoul at the Union Square Theatre and played Paul Bland. He starred in the 1994 revival of Carousel at the Vivian Beaumont Theater. He starred as Enoch Snow.

He starred in Redhead at the Goodspeed Opera House in East Haddam, Connecticut as George Poppett.

2000s
He was in the original cast of Taking a Chance on Love at the York Theatre in 2000, which he won an Obie Award. He was also in Seussical in 2000 as Ensemble/Grandpa Who. This was after his 12-minute number The Lorax in which he played The Onceler was cut after the Boston tryout.

Then in 2001, he was in the concert version of Bloomer Girl as Ebenezer Mimms/Ensemble put on by Encores!

He was next seen at North Shore Music Theatre in their 2002 production of Dracula: A Chamber Musical, where he starred as R.M. Renfield.

He was then cast in the original production Wicked as a swing and then an understudy for Doctor Dillamond and The Wonderful Wizard of Oz in 2003.

Then in 2004 he was in The Irish Curse at the Fringe Festival.

In 2005 he starred in the original play After the Night and the Music at the Manhattan Theatre Club as Keith.

2006 saw Korbich in the original production of the musical The Drowsy Chaperone as George, earning him a Drama Desk Award nomination for best-featured actor. He would go on to be in the limited run of The Most Happy Fella at the State Theatre at Lincoln Center as the Doctor. (Fella was between The Ahmanson tryout and the Broadway run of Drowsy.)

He then appeared in the Face the Music revival in 2007 at the New York City Center. 

In 2008 he was the original Scuttle in the musical The Little Mermaid.

In the fall of 2010, Korbich performed at the La Jolla Playhouse in San Diego, California in the world premiere of Limelight: The Story of Charlie Chaplin, a musical detailing the life of Charlie Chaplin. In February 2011 he was Gus/Growltiger and Bustopher Jones in Cats at Musical Theatre West in Long Beach, California.

In 2012, Korbich appeared in the original Broadway cast of A Christmas Story, appearing as Santa Claus and the Doctor.

In 2013, Korbich was in the Emilia Clarke-led Broadway production of Breakfast at Tiffany's. Later that year, Korbich was in the original cast of A Gentleman's Guide to Love and Murder.

Filmography

Discography

References

External links

Eddie Korbich on Off-Broadway Database

Korbich at Broadwayworld.com

1960 births
Living people
American male dancers
American male musical theatre actors
American male television actors
American male voice actors
Boston Conservatory at Berklee alumni
People from Shamokin, Pennsylvania